West Virginia Route 94 is a  long north–south route connecting Marmet and Racine in West Virginia. The southern terminus of the route is at West Virginia Route 3 in Racine. The northern terminus is at West Virginia Route 61 in Marmet.

WV 94 was once signed in West Huntington from Interstate 64 to the Nick Joe Rahall II Bridge beginning in 1970.  In 1984, the route was decommissioned and replaced instead by US 52. With the completion of Corridor G in the 1980s and 1990s, WV 94 would later resurface, replacing U.S. Route 119's former corridor as it was realigned with Corridor G.

Major intersections

References

094
Transportation in Boone County, West Virginia
Transportation in Kanawha County, West Virginia